Charles Samuel Bovy-Lysberg (Charles Lysberg) (1 February/March 1821 – 15/25 February 1873) was a Swiss pianist and composer.

Biography
He was born in Geneva and received his early music education there. In 1835 he went to Paris, where he studied under Frédéric Chopin and met Franz Liszt. The latter was particularly supportive and helped publish Bovy-Lysberg's Les Suissesses, Op. 1, a set of waltzes for piano. By mid-1840s Bovy-Lysberg was becoming a well-known teacher and performer in Paris, but after the French Revolution of 1848 he had to leave for his home town. He got married in 1848 and settled in his wife's castle in Dardagny, near Geneva. He stayed there for the rest of his life, frequently giving recitals in Geneva and the neighbouring towns, organizing concerts and publishing his music. He also taught at the Geneva Conservatory in 1848–9 and 1870–3. He composed more than 150 pieces, most of them short works for piano, very popular in Geneva salons of his time, but almost completely unknown today. A street in Geneva is named after him, rue Bovy-Lysberg.

Selected works

Piano
 Op. 1. Les Suissesses. 5 Valses brillantes.
 Op. 3. 4 Romances (I. A Marie. II. Rêve. III. Espoir. IV. Souvenir)
 Op. 4. Le Lac de Brientz. Quadrille
 Op. 6. Les Amaranthes. 4 Valses brillantes.
 Op. 8. Les Roses d'automne. Valses brillantes.
 Op. 9. La Reine des Prés. Valse brillante.
 Op. 10. Trois nocturnes
 Op. 11. Fantaisie
 Op. 14. Six Etudes de Salon
 Op. 15. 4 Romances
 Op. 16. Fantaisie sur: Guillaume Tell de Rossini
 Op. 17. Rose des Alpes. Valse brillante.
 Op. 18. 6 Caprices
 Op. 20. Etude pour la Maine gauche seule.
 Op. 21. Fantaisie brillante sur la cavatine fav. de La Niobe de Pacini
 Op. 23. Divertissement brillante.
 Op. 25. Deuxieme barcarolle
 Op. 26. La Napolitana. Etude de Légèreté.
 Op. 27. 3 Romances sans paroles (I. Regrets. II. Invocation. III. Aveu)
 Op. 28. Terpsichore. Caprice.
 Op. 29. Deux Nocturnes
 Op. 30. 3 Romances sans paroles (I. Près d'une chapelle. II. Soir d'Automne. III. Rayon de Bonheur)
 Op. 31. Sérénade.
 Op. 32. Tarantelle.
 Op. 33. Carillon. Impromptu.
 Op. 34. La Fontaine. Idylle.
 Op. 35. Bohémienne. Caprice.
 Op. 36. 2 Rêveries (I. Le Crépuscule. II. L'Aube)
 Op. 37. Le Tornoi. Poème musical.
 Op. 38. Romanesca
 Op. 39. Réveil des Oiseaux. Idylle.
 Op. 40. Le Hamac. Berceuse.
 Op. 41. Fantaisie sur des Airs suisses
 Op. 42. Danse arménienne.
 Op. 43. Menuet dans le style ancien.
 Op. 44. Caprice silésien.
 Op. 45. Fantaisie. Galop.
 Op. 46. Pensées de Mai. 2 Romances sans paroles.
 Op. 47. Un Rêve d'enfant. Mélodie.
 Op. 48. Valse brillante.
 Op. 49. Fantaisie brillante sur Le Fanchonnette de Clapisson
 Op. 50. Allegro de concert
 Op. 51. La Baladine. Caprice
 Op. 52. Fantaisie alpestre
 Op. 53. Valse brillante.
 Op. 54. Chant d'Appenzell. Bluette brillante.
 Op. 55. Chant du Nautonnier. Barcarolle.
 Op. 56. Océan. Méditation.
 Op. 57. L'Amazone. Caprice.
 Op. 58. L'Angelus du Matin
 Op. 59. Le Tic-tac du moulin
 Op. 60. Menuet
 Op. 61. Reflets intimes. 3 Mélodies. (I. Céleste quiétude. II. Mes Rêves chéris. III. Au Printemps.)
 Op. 62. Idylle
 Op. 63. Giovinetta. Impromptu-Galop.
 Op. 64. La Moldavienne. Fantaisie.
 Op. 66. La Bayadère. Caprice du genre.
 Op. 67. Berceuse
 Op. 68. La Ballerina. Caprice de genre
 Op. 74. La Coucaratcha. Fantaisie
 Op. 77. L'écharpe blanche. Valse de salon. (publ. by P. Jürgenson, ca1871)
 Op. 78. Ressouvenir. Ballade
 Op. 79. Morceau de Concert sur Don Juan de Mozart, pour 2 Pianos
 Op. 82. Boléro
 Op. 83. Airs savoisiens, variés
 Op. 86. La Rêveuse
 Op. 89. Souvenir de Don Juan
 Op. 89. Le départ du hameau. Mélodie
 Op. 94. Sur l'onde.
 Op. 99. Fantaisie surl'opera Faust
 Op. 106. Polonaise
 Op. 107. La Chasse
 Op. 111. Pensierosa. Valse sentimentale
 Op. 117. Quatrième valse de salon
 Op. 122. Chanson du gondolier
 Op. 124. Expansion nr1
 Op. 126. La balancelle. Caprice imitatif nr1
 Op. 130. Valse styrienne. a 4 mains
 Op. 135. La captive
 Op. 140. Andante
 Op. 145. En songeant a Chopin
 Op. 148. Esquisse musicale
 Op. 149. Deux idylles
 Op. 153. Confidence
 Op. 155. Vielle histoire
 Le chant du rouet
 Au bord du lac. Marche des bersaglieri
 Marche des chevaliers-gardes. a 4 mains

Stage
 La fille du carillonneur, comic opera (first performance 1854)
 Les Alpes, cantata (1860)

References

 
 Hofmeister, Adolf Moritz, and Hofmeister, Friedrich (ed.): Handbuch der musikalischen Literatur, vol. 5 (1860), p. 178.

External links
 

1873 deaths
1821 births
19th-century classical composers
19th-century male musicians
19th-century musicians
Musicians from Geneva
Swiss classical composers
Swiss male classical composers